Suchtelenia is a monotypic genus of flowering plant belonging to the family Boraginaceae. It only contains one known species, Suchtelenia calycina (C.A.Mey.) DC. 

It also has a subspecies, Suchtelenia calycina var. calycina. It has 3 known synonyms; Suchtelenia cerinthifolia , Suchtelenia eriophora  and Suchtelenia uniserialis .

It is native to Iran and Kazakhstan, Turkmenistan and Uzbekistan in Central Asia.

The genus name of Suchtelenia is in honour of Paul van Suchtelen (1788–1833), a Dutch-born Russian military officer. The Latin specific epithet of calycina is derived from the Greek calycinus mening	like a calyx or with a prominent calyx. It was first described and published in Pl. Vasc. Gen. Vol.1 on page 188 in 1839. The species was published in Prodr. Vol.10 on page 163 in 1846.

References

Boraginoideae
Boraginaceae genera
Plants described in 1839
Flora of Iran
Flora of Central Asia